Cromer is  a coastal town in Norfolk.

Cromer may also refer to:

Places
Cromer, New South Wales, a suburb of Sydney, Australia
Cromer, South Australia, a locality
Cromer, Manitoba, Canada, a village
Cromer, Hertfordshire, England, a hamlet and civil parish

People
Cromer (surname)
Earl of Cromer
Evelyn Baring, 1st Earl of Cromer, British official in control of Egypt 1883-1907
Rowland Baring, 2nd Earl of Cromer
Rowland Baring, 3rd Earl of Cromer
Cromer Ashburnham (1831–1917), British Army major-general

Other uses
10283 Cromer, main-belt asteroid
HMS Cromer (J128), a Bangor-class minesweeper lost in 1942
HMS Cromer (M103), a Sandown-class minehunter launched in 1990 and decommissioned in 2001
HMS Cromer (1867), a Britomart-class wooden screw gunboat of the Royal Navy
Cromer Street, London
Cromer Academy, Cromer, Norfolk, a secondary school
Cromer railway station, Cromer, Norfolk

See also
Cromer Town F.C.
Cromer Lifeboat Station
Cromer Lighthouse
Cromer Forest Bed
Cromer Ridge
Cromers, Georgia, United States, an unincorporated community
Cromers, Ohio, United States, an unincorporated community